Françoise Javet (17 January 1922 - 25 February 2008) was a French film editor who was active in France between 1947 and 1988. In 1982, she was nominated for a César Award for her work editing La Balance.

Selected filmography 

 Bonjour l'angoisse (1988)
 Flag (1987)
 La gitane (1986)
 How Did You Get In? We Didn't See You Leave (1984)
 La balance (1982)
 Psy (1981)
 Molière (1978)
 Dear Inspector (1977)
 Boomerang (1976)
 Incorrigible (1975)
 Vous ne l'emporterez pas au paradis (1975)
 The Down-in-the-Hole Gang (1974)
 Two Men in Town (1973)
 Il n'y a pas de fumée sans feu (1973)
 Scoumoune (1972)
 The Annuity (1972)
 The Deadly Trap (1971)
 Rider on the Rain (1970)
 The Devil by the Tail (1969)
 The Comedians (1967)
 King of Hearts (1966)
 Up to His Ears (1965)
 Male Companion (1964)
 That Man from Rio (1964)
 A King Without Distraction (1963)
 We Will Go to Deauville (1962)
 And Satan Calls the Turns (1962)
 A View from the Bridge (1962)
 Me faire ça à moi (1961)
 Black Tights (1961)
 Purple Noon (1960)
 La marraine de Charley (1959)
 Taxi, Trailer and Corrida (1958)
 Women Are Talkative (1958)
 Club of Women (1956)
 L'inspecteur connaît la musique (1956)
 Diamond Machine (1955)
 The Doctors (1955)
 Lovers, Happy Lovers! (1954)

References

External links

French film editors
French women film editors
1922 births
2008 deaths